Bradby may refer to:

John Bradby Blake (1745–1773), English botanist who collected seeds in China
Anne Barbara Bradby (married name: Anne Ridler) OBE (1912–2001), British poet and Faber and Faber editor
Barbara Bradby (1873–1961), English social historian, researcher and writer
David Bradby (1942–2011), British drama and theatre academic
Edward Bradby (1827–1893), classicist, House Master at Harrow, Headmaster of Haileybury College
Edward Bradby (cricketer) (1866–1947), English first-class cricketer and solicitor
G. F. Bradby (1863–1947), schoolmaster at Rugby School, with a wide-ranging literary career
Henry Bradby (1868–1947), English first-class cricketer, schoolmaster and poet
James Bradby (1929–1968), American law enforcement officer
Tom Bradby (born 1967), British journalist and novelist, presenter of the ITV News at Ten

See also
The Agenda with Tom Bradby, political discussion programme on British television network ITV
Bradby Shield Encounter, known as "The Bradby", the pinnacle of Sri Lanka's school rugby union season